Poseidon is the god of the sea in ancient Greek mythology.

Poseidon may also refer to:

People
 Posidonius, ancient Greek astronomer and geographer

Fictional characters
 Poseidon (Saint Seiya), manga deity character based on the Greek god
 Poseidon (DC Comics), a deity character based on the Greek god
 Jacob Anton Ness, a fictional character from Prison Break known as "Poseidon"
 Poseidon "Postie" Paterson, a fictional character from the Selby novel series

Places
 Poseidon Ocean, an ocean that once existed during the Mesoproterozoic
 Poseidon Pass, a pass on the Antarctic Peninsula
 Poseidon Pond, a pond in Antarctica

In space
 4341 Poseidon, an asteroid
 Poseidon, an obsolete name for Pasiphae, a moon of the planet Jupiter

Art, entertainment, and media

Film
 The Poseidon Adventure (1972 film), a 1972 film based on Paul Gallico's novel
 Beyond the Poseidon Adventure, a 1979 sequel to the first film, based on a second book by Paul Gallico that had been commissioned by the film makers
 The Poseidon Adventure (2005 film), a 2005 television film loosely based on Paul Gallico's first novel, as well as the first film
 Poseidon (film), a 2006 film based on Paul Gallico's first novel as well as the first film
 USS Poseidon: Phantom Below, a 2006 film

Literature
 "Poseidon" (short story) by Franz Kafka
 The Poseidon Adventure (novel), a 1969 novel by Paul Gallico.

Music
 Poseidon (album), by French band Dagoba
 Poseidon (EP), by The Mavis's
 In the Wake of Poseidon, an album by British band King Crimson
 Poseidon (Keep me Safe), a 2017 song by Dhani Harrison from In Parallel

Other A&E properties
 Poseidon: Master of Atlantis, a videogame expansion pack
 WinBack 2: Project Poseidon, a third-person shooter videogame
 Poseidon (TV series), 2011 South Korean drama

Fictional elements
 Poseidon (fictional ship), featured in both of Paul Gallico's novels and the four film adaptations

Sports
 Poseidon (horse), an Australian Thoroughbred
 Pärnu JK Poseidon, Parnu, Estonia; a soccer team
 Poseidon Neon Poron, Neon Poron, Greece; a soccer team

Groups, organizations, companies
 Poseidon School, Los Angeles, California, USA; a private day school
 Poseidon Society, a funerary company
 Poseidon Press, a defunct American publishing house
 Poseidon Expeditions, an expedition cruise tour operator

Transportation and vehicles
 Boeing P-8 Poseidon, a U.S. made anti-submarine military aircraft
 TOPEX/Poseidon, an oceanographic satellite and space mission 
 UGM-73 Poseidon, a U.S. Navy nuclear ballistic missile system
 Poseidon, Russian nuclear-powered nuclear-armed unmanned underwater vehicle

Ships
 Poseidon (ship name)
 , a Royal Navy Parthian-class submarine launched in 1929 and sunk in 1931
 Poseidon (A-12), a Spanish Navy salvage and support vessel for submarines
 BN Poseidon was 1951–1959 a coastal tanker launched in 1942 as Empire Faun
 SS Poseidon was 1968–1969 a steam cargo ship launched in 1941 as Empire Ballard
 ST Poseidon was 1973–1976 a steam tug launched in 1941 as Empire Fir
 , a U.S. Navy Achelous-class repair ship launched in 1944 and sold in 1961
 , a Gato-class submarine
 Poseidon-class submarine, a Greek submarine class

Computing and technology
 PoSeidon (Malware), a virus targeting point-of-sale computer systems
 Poseidon drowning detection system, computer aided swimming pool safety equipment
 Poseidon Linux, an operating system
 Poseidon, a specific implementation of the ISO 8583 electronic payment protocol 
 Poseidon, a series of space-based radar altimeters
 Poseidon-1, a CNES-built Ku-band radar altimeter aboard TOPEX/Poseidon oceanographic satellite
 Poseidon-2, a radar altimeter on board the Jason-1 oceanographic satellite
 Poseidon-3, a radar altimeter on board the OSTM/Jason-2 oceanographic satellite
 Poseidon-3B, a radar altimeter on board the Jason-3 oceanographic satellite

Other uses
 Poseidon bubble, an Australian stock market bubble
 Poseidon, the Boardwalk Hall Auditorium Organ in Atlantic City, New Jersey
 Poseidon (species), species with the specifier poseidon

See also

 
 The Poseidon Adventure (disambiguation)
 Poseidonia (disambiguation)
 Posidonia (disambiguation)